The 1994 European Parliament election in Italy was the election of the delegation from Italy to the European Parliament in 1994.

It was the first continental election after the scandal of Tangentopoli which destroyed the traditional republican parties of Italy: consequently, all new parties contested the race.

Electoral system

The pure party-list proportional representation was the traditional electoral system of the Italian Republic since its foundation in 1946, so it had been adopted to elect the Italian representatives to the European Parliament too. Two levels were used: a national level to divide seats between parties, and a constituency level to distribute them between candidates. Italian regions were united in 5 constituencies, each electing a group of deputies. At national level, seats were divided between party lists using the largest remainder method with Hare quota. All seats gained by each party were automatically distributed to their local open lists and their most voted candidates.

Results

The new party Forza Italia (FI), led by the Italian Prime Minister Silvio Berlusconi, won the election with 30.6% of the vote and 27 seats. The second party was the Democratic Party of the Left (PDS), main heir of the Italian Communist Party (PCI), that gained 19.1% of the vote and 16 seats, while the third party was National Alliance (AN), heir of the Italian Social Movement (MSI), that gained 12.5% of the vote and 11 seats. The Italian People's Party (PPI), main heir of Christian Democracy (DC), gained only 10.0% of the vote and 8 seats.

See also
1994 Italian general election

References

Italy
1994 elections in Italy
European Parliament elections in Italy